= Canoiwala Mohra =

- Tehsil
- Location within Pakistan
- Coordinates: 33.24°N 73.23°E
- Country: Pakistan
- Province: Islamabad C.T
- Elevation: 497 m (1,631 ft)
- Time zone: UTC+5 (PST)

Canoiwala Mohra is a town in the Islamabad Capital Territory of Pakistan. It is located at 33° 24' 55N 73° 23' 40E with an altitude of 497 metres (1633 feet).
